Matthew Ewing (January 10, 1815 – 1874) was an American carpenter and inventor. He is known as the cofounder of the Vacuum Oil Company with business partner Hiram Bond Everest.

Biography
Ewing was born January 10, 1815, in Floyd, New York. The Ewing family moved to Rochester, New York, in 1857. During the Civil War, he enlisted alongside his son in Co. G of the 108th NY Infantry. Ewing was a carpenter by trade, and also an inventor. 
 After inventing a vacuum distillation method for producing kerosene, he and business partner Hiram Bond Everest founded the Vacuum Oil Company in 1866.  Ewing later sold his share in the company to Everest.

Marriage and children
Matthew and Sarah Ewing married c. 1839 and had 4 children: Emma, Mary, George P. and Alma.

Death and afterward
Ewing died in 1874. In 1879 the Standard Oil Co. purchased a three-quarters interest in Vacuum Oil Company for $200,000. As a lubricants pioneer, Vacuum Oil introduced revolutionary products, such as  Gargoyle 600-W Steam Cylinder Oil. The Standard Oil company grew into what is today known as ExxonMobil.

References

1815 births
1874 deaths
19th-century American inventors
People from Oneida County, New York